Sanin Muminović (born 2 November 1990) is a Croatian professional footballer who plays as a defender for Bosnian Premier League club Krupa.

Career
Muminović started his senior career with Orijent. After that, he played for Pomorac 1921, Krka, Zavrč, Valdres, and Novigrad. In 2017, Muminović signed with Slovenian PrvaLiga club Aluminij, where he made 36 appearances and scored one goal.

On 10 August 2020, he joined Austrian club Horn.

On 31 January 2021, Muminović signed a contract with Bosnian Premier League club Krupa. He made his official debut for the club on 27 February 2021, in a league game against Zrinjski Mostar.

References

External links
The Croat returned from Iraq and stepped up the biggest surprise of the 1st SNL 
Sanin Muminović: "The best goal of my career!" 
Sanin Muminović: I have never been in my career
Sanin Muminović, football player from Novigrad: With a few reinforcements, we could fight for the top of the Second League
We will be even better when the championship starts

1990 births
Living people
People from Srebrenica
Association football defenders
Bosnia and Herzegovina footballers
HNK Orijent players
NK Pomorac 1921 players
NK Krka players
NK Zavrč players
NK Novigrad players
NK Aluminij players
Al-Quwa Al-Jawiya players
SV Horn players
FK Krupa players
First Football League (Croatia) players
Slovenian PrvaLiga players
Norwegian Third Division players
2. Liga (Austria) players
Premier League of Bosnia and Herzegovina players
Bosnia and Herzegovina expatriate footballers
Expatriate footballers in Croatia
Bosnia and Herzegovina expatriate sportspeople in Croatia
Expatriate footballers in Slovenia
Bosnia and Herzegovina expatriate sportspeople in Slovenia
Expatriate footballers in Norway
Bosnia and Herzegovina expatriate sportspeople in Norway
Expatriate footballers in Iraq
Expatriate footballers in Austria
Bosnia and Herzegovina expatriate sportspeople in Austria